Van Driel is a Dutch toponymic surname meaning "from Driel" or "from Maasdriel", which municipality was until recently called "Driel" as well. People with the surname include:

Berry van Driel (born 1984), Dutch baseball player
Darius van Driel (born 1989), Dutch golfer
 (born 1962), Dutch comics artist and movie director
Mels van Driel (born 1983), Dutch footballer
Raymond van Driel (born 1983), Dutch footballer
Rita van Driel (born 1961), Secretary General of the National Paralympic Committee of the Netherlands 
Sonja van Driel (born 1959), Dutch photographer
Toon van Driel (born 1945), Dutch cartoonist
Repelaer van Driel:
 (1759–1832), Dutch government minister
Roline Repelaer van Driel (born 1984), Dutch rower

References

Dutch-language surnames
Surnames of Dutch origin
Toponymic surnames